In the inaugural edition of the tournament, Jakob Hlasek and Michael Stich won the title after defeating Jim Grabb and Patrick McEnroe 7–6, 6–3 in the final.

Seeds

Draw

Draw

References

External links
 Official results archive (ATP)
 Official results archive (ITF)

Rosmalen Grass Court Championships
1990 ATP Tour